¡Románticos! (English Romantic) is a compilation album released by Juan Gabriel with Spanish singer Rocío Dúrcal on 12 January 1999   Again, other compilation álbum alternating songs from Juan Gabriel's  1982 album Cosas de Enamorados and Rocio Durcal numbers.

Track listing

References

External links 
Juan Gabriel official myspace site
 Romanticos! on amazon.com
[] Romanticos! on allmusic.com

1999 compilation albums
Juan Gabriel compilation albums
RCA Records compilation albums
Spanish-language compilation albums
Rocío Dúrcal albums